Paral·lel is a Barcelona metro station, located under Avinguda del Paral·lel, between the streets of Ronda de Sant Pau and Carrer Nou de la Rambla. It is served by L3, is the southern terminus of L2, and also the lower terminal of the Funicular de Montjuïc.

The station has two levels. The platforms for lines L2 and L3 are situated side by side at the lower level, with each line having a pair of side platforms. A direct connection is provided between the platforms for Zona Universitària (L3) and Badalona – Pompeu Fabra (L2). The funicular terminus is at the upper level, with side platforms on either side of the single terminal track. Transfers between the funicular and lines L2 and L3 are inside the ticket barriers of the station, and from a fare perspective the funicular is treated as another line of the metro.

The station opened in 1970 with the extension of line L3 from Drassanes. When the line was extended to Zona Universitària, it was initially operated in two sections, with the overhead electrified L3 towards Catalunya and the third rail electrified L3b towards Zona Universitària. The L3 trains terminated in the current L3 platforms, whilst the L3b trains used those now used by L2. The two sections were unified, with L3b converted to overhead electrification, in June 1982, and the L3b platforms were used for train storage. In 1996, line L2 was extended from Sant Antoni, reusing the erstwhile L3b platforms as the L2's terminus.

Future plans are for L2 to be diverted at Sant Antoni, via an interchange with L3 at Poble Sec, to Barcelona Airport. This diversion will render the section of L2 from Sant Antoni to Paral·lel, and the L2 terminal tracks at Paral·lel, redundant.

References

External links
Paral·lel metro station at Trenscat.com

Railway stations in Spain opened in 1995
Barcelona Metro line 2 stations
Barcelona Metro line 3 stations
Funicular de Montjuïc stations
Railway stations in Spain opened in 1970
Transport in Sants-Montjuïc